The heptyl homologue of cannabidiol was identified as a natural phytocannabinoid and named cannabidiphorol (CBDP) in 2019. It had previously been reported as a synthetic compound, but was not identified as a natural product prior to 2019.

References

See also
 CBD-DMH
 Tetrahydrocannabiphorol

Phytocannabinoids
2,6-Dihydroxybiphenyls